Courtenay Airpark  is located adjacent to Courtenay, British Columbia, Canada.

See also
 List of airports on Vancouver Island

References

External links

Page about this airport on COPA's Places to Fly airport directory

Registered aerodromes in British Columbia
Courtenay, British Columbia
Transport on Vancouver Island